Craig Ferguson (born 17 May 1962) is a Scottish comedian, actor, writer, and television host. He is best known for hosting the CBS late-night talk show The Late Late Show with Craig Ferguson (2005–2014), for which he won a Peabody Award in 2009 for his interview with South African archbishop Desmond Tutu that year. He also hosted the syndicated game show Celebrity Name Game (2014–2017), for which he won two Daytime Emmy Awards, and Join or Die with Craig Ferguson (2016) on History. In 2017 he released a six-episode web show with his wife, Megan Wallace Cunningham, titled Couple Thinkers.

After starting his career in the UK with music, comedy, and theatre, Ferguson moved to the U.S., where he appeared in the role of Nigel Wick on the ABC sitcom The Drew Carey Show (1996–2004). Ferguson has written three books: Between the Bridge and the River, a novel; American on Purpose, a memoir; and Riding the Elephant: A Memoir of Altercations, Humiliations, Hallucinations & Observations. He holds both British and American citizenship.

He has written and starred in three films, directing one of them, and has appeared in several others, including several voice-over roles for animations. He provided voice work for Gobber in the How to Train Your Dragon film series (2010–2019), Owl in Winnie the Pooh (2011) and Lord Macintosh in Brave (2012).

Early life and education
Ferguson was born in Stobhill Hospital in the Springburn district of Glasgow, to Robert and Janet Ferguson on 17 May 1962. When he was 6 months old, he and his family moved from their Springburn flat to a Development Corporation house in the  nearby New Town of Cumbernauld, where he grew up "chubby and bullied". They lived there as Cumbernauld was rehousing many Glaswegians away from the poor housing conditions and damage to the city from World War II. Ferguson attended Muirfield Primary School and Cumbernauld High School. At age 16, Ferguson left high school and began an apprenticeship to be an electronics technician at a local factory of American company Burroughs Corporation.

His first visit to the United States was in 1975, when he was 13, to visit an uncle who lived on Long Island, near New York City. When he moved to New York City in 1983, he worked in construction in Harlem. Ferguson later became a bouncer at the nightclub Save the Robots before returning to Scotland.

Career

UK career
Ferguson's experience in entertainment began as a teenager as a drummer for Glasgow punk bands such as the Night Creatures and Exposure. Shortly afterward, he had a brief stint as a drummer for the post-punk band Ana Hausen, who released a single for Human Records in 1981.  He then joined a punk band called The Bastards from Hell. The band, later renamed Dreamboys, and fronted by vocalist Peter Capaldi, performed regularly in Glasgow from 1980 to 1982. Ferguson credits Capaldi for inspiring him to try comedy. When he was 18, he worked as a session musician and performed as a drummer for Nico during a few gigs when she toured Scotland.

After a nerve-racking first comedy appearance, he decided to create a character that he described as a "parody of all the über-patriotic native folk singers who seemed to infect every public performance in Scotland". The character was named "Bing Hitler" by Capaldi. Ferguson first performed as the character in Glasgow, and he later became a hit at the 1986 Edinburgh Festival Fringe. However, by the end of the year, Ferguson was already discussing his intention to retire Bing. At the press launch for an alternative pantomime of Sleeping Beauty (which he had co-written with Capaldi), he said "you can't write for just one character forever". A recording of his stage act as Bing Hitler was made at Glasgow's Tron Theatre and released in the 1980s; a Bing Hitler monologue ("A Lecture for Burns Night") appears on the compilation cassette Honey at the Core.

After enjoying success at the Edinburgh Festival, Ferguson appeared on television as 'Confidence' in Red Dwarf, on STV's Hogmanay Shows, and on the 1993 One Foot in the Grave Christmas special One Foot in the Algarve. In 1990, a pilot of The Craig Ferguson Show, a one-off comedy pilot for Granada Television, was broadcast. It co-starred Paul Whitehouse and Helen Atkinson-Wood. In 1991, Channel 4 asked him to host Friday at the Dome, a 75-minute live music show. In 1992, he was given his own BBC Scotland show, 2000 Not Out.

In 1993, he presented a six-part archaeology TV series, The Dirt Detective, for STV. Also in 1993, he was given a six-part TV series on BBC One. The Ferguson Theory was a mix of stand-up and sketches recorded the day before transmission. In 2017, it was announced that he would return to UK television for the first time in 25 years in a guest role in BBC Scotland's comedy Still Game, to be shown in 2018.

Ferguson also found success in musical theatre. Beginning in 1991, he appeared on stage as Brad Majors in the London production of The Rocky Horror Show. In 1994, Ferguson played Father MacLean in production of Bad Boy Johnny and the Prophets of Doom at the Union Chapel in London. The same year, he appeared again at the Edinburgh Fringe, as Oscar Madison in The Odd Couple.

In 2022, Ferguson's film Saving Grace (2000) was announced to be adapted into a stage musical aimed for a 2023 run in West End. Ferguson will portray a "villainous banker" in the adaptation. The musical was adapted by April De Angelis from Ferguson and Mark Crowdy's screenplay with music by KT Tunstall.

US career

Ferguson moved to Los Angeles in November 1994, after his soon-to-be agent Rick Siegel saw Ferguson during the Edinburgh Festival and suggested that he come to America. His first US role was as baker Logan McDonough on the short-lived 1995 ABC comedy Maybe This Time, which starred Betty White and Marie Osmond.

His breakthrough in the US came when he was cast on The Drew Carey Show as the title character's boss, Mr. Wick, a role he played from 1996 to 2003. He played the role with an over-the-top posh English accent "to make up for generations of English actors doing crap Scottish accents". In his comedy special "A Wee Bit o' Revolution", he specifically identified James Doohan's portrayal of Montgomery Scott on Star Trek as the foundation of his "revenge". (At the end of one episode, though, Ferguson broke the fourth wall and began talking to the audience at home in his regular Scottish accent.) His character was memorable for his unique methods of laying employees off, almost always "firing Johnson", the most common last name of the to-be-fired workers. Even after leaving the show in 2003, he remained a recurring character on the series for the last two seasons, and was part of the two-part series finale in 2004.

During the production of The Drew Carey Show, Ferguson devoted his off-time as a cast member to writing, working in his trailer on set in between shooting his scenes. He wrote and starred in three films: The Big Tease, Saving Grace, and I'll Be There; he also directed the latter, for which he won the Audience Award for Best Film at the Aspen, Dallas, and Valencia film festivals. He was named Best New Director at the Napa Valley Film Festival. These were among other scripts that, "in the great tradition of the movie business, about half a dozen that I got paid a fortune for but never got made."

His other acting credits in films include Niagara Motel, Lenny the Wonder Dog, Lemony Snicket's A Series of Unfortunate Events, Chain of Fools, Born Romantic, The Ugly Truth, Kick-Ass, and, as a voice-over actor, How to Train Your Dragon, How to Train Your Dragon 2, Brave, and Winnie the Pooh.

Ferguson has been touring the United States and Canada with a comedy show since the late 2000s, including a performance at Carnegie Hall on 23 October 2010 and a performance at Radio City Music Hall on 6 October 2012. He has performed two stand-up television specials on Comedy Central, both released on DVD: A Wee Bit o' Revolution in 2009 and Does This Need to Be Said? in 2011. His third comedy special, I'm Here to Help, was released on Netflix in 2013, garnering positive reviews of 4 out of 5 stars on Netflix and peaking at number 6 on Billboard top comedy albums. It also received a 2014 Grammy Award nomination for Best Comedy Album.

Ferguson was awarded the Peter Ustinov Comedy Award by the Banff World Media Festival on 11 June 2013.

The Late Late Show

In December 2004, it was announced that Ferguson would succeed Craig Kilborn on CBS's The Late Late Show. His first show as the regular host aired on 3 January 2005. The show was unique in that it had no "human" sidekicks such as Ed McMahon on The Tonight Show with Johnny Carson or Conan O'Brien's Andy Richter. He had a remotely operated robot skeleton named Geoff Peterson and two silent performers in a pantomime horse costume that were added in 2010. His monologues were conducted within a few feet of the camera versus the long distance Johnny Carson kept from the camera and audience.

The Late Late Show averaged 2.0 million viewers in its 2007 season, compared with 2.5 million for Late Night with Conan O'Brien. In April 2008, The Late Late Show with Craig Ferguson beat Late Night with Conan O'Brien for weekly ratings (1.88 million to 1.77 million) for the first time since the two shows went head-to-head with their respective hosts.

In March 2009, Craig Ferguson topped Jimmy Fallon in the ratings with Ferguson getting a 1.8 rating/6 share and Fallon receiving a 1.6 rating/6 share. By 2014, Ferguson's ratings had faltered, trailing those of Late Night with Seth Meyers with an average of 1.35 million viewers versus 2.02 million.

On 28 April 2014, Ferguson announced he would leave The Late Late Show at the end of 2014, with the final episode airing on 19 December. His contract was set to expire in June 2014, but a six-month extension was agreed on to provide a more graceful exit and give CBS more time to find a replacement host. He reportedly received  as part of his contract because he was not selected as the replacement for David Letterman's Late Show. Ferguson made the decision prior to Letterman's announcement but agreed to delay making his own decision public until the reaction to Letterman's decision (announced April 3rd) had died down. CBS Entertainment Chair Nina Tassler said, following the announcement, that in his decade as host Ferguson had "infused the broadcast with tremendous energy, unique comedy, insightful interviews and some of the most heartfelt monologues seen on television." CBS continued the franchise with James Corden as the new host.

Television work

Craig Ferguson has made guest appearances on The Tonight Show with Jay Leno, Late Show with David Letterman, Late Night with Conan O'Brien, Rachael Ray, Countdown with Keith Olbermann, The Howard Stern Show, The Daily Show, The View, Loveline, Real Time with Bill Maher, The Soup, The Talk, The Price Is Right, Kevin Pollak's Chat Show, The Dennis Miller Show and The Late Show with Stephen Colbert. He also co-hosted Live with Regis & Kelly with Kelly Ripa and was guest host on the April Fools' Day episode of The Price Is Right in 2014.

In 2009, Ferguson made a cameo live-action appearance in the episode "We Love You, Conrad" on Family Guy. Ferguson hosted the 32nd annual People's Choice Awards on 10 January 2006. TV Guide magazine printed a "Cheers" (Cheers and Jeers section) for appearing on his own show that same evening. From 2007 to 2010, Ferguson hosted the Boston Pops Fireworks Spectacular on 4 July, broadcast nationally by CBS. Ferguson was the featured entertainer at 26 April 2008 White House Correspondents' Association dinner in Washington, DC.

Ferguson co-presented the Emmy Award for Outstanding Lead Actress in a Drama with Brooke Shields in 2008. He has done voice work in cartoons, including being the voice of Barry's evil alter-ego in the "With Friends Like Steve's" episode of American Dad!; in Freakazoid! as Roddy MacStew, Freakazoid's mentor; and on Buzz Lightyear of Star Command as the robot vampire NOS-4-A2. He was the voice of Susan the boil on Futurama, which was a parody of Scottish singer Susan Boyle. He makes stand-up appearances in Las Vegas and New York City. He headlined in the Just for Laughs festival in Montreal and in October 2008 Ferguson taped his stand up show in Boston for a Comedy Central special entitled A Wee Bit o' Revolution, which aired on 22 March 2009.

British television comedy drama Doc Martin was based on a character from Ferguson's film Saving Grace – with Ferguson getting writing credits for 12 episodes. On 6 November 2009, Ferguson appeared as himself in a SpongeBob SquarePants special titled SpongeBob's Truth or Square. He hosted Discovery Channel's 23rd season of Shark Week in 2010. Ferguson briefly appeared in Toby Keith's "Red Solo Cup" music video released on 10 October 2011.

In September 2013, Ferguson guest-starred on the season finale of Hot in Cleveland as a priest/tabloid journalist who turns out to be the father of Joy's (Jane Leeves) son. The show reunited him with former co-star and frequent Late Late Show guest Betty White. Ferguson reprised the role for several episodes when the show returned in March 2014.

In January 2023, Sony Pictures Television (SPT) announced a new, half-hour syndicated late night talk show with Craig Ferguson as host. Channel Surf with Craig Ferguson will be produced by Whisper North and will be distributed by SPT. A pilot for Channel Surf with Craig Ferguson was shot in the UK this month at Dock10 studios, and SPT will take the show out to potential buyers in Los Angeles.

Celebrity Name Game

In October 2013, it was announced that Ferguson would host the syndicated game show Celebrity Name Game, produced by Coquette Productions, beginning in late 2014. Ferguson's involvement in the project dates back to 2011, when it was originally pitched and piloted as a CBS primetime series. , the series had an initial order of 180 episodes. The syndicated series began airing on 22 September 2014. Ferguson won Daytime Emmy Awards for Outstanding Game Show Host for Celebrity Name Game in 2015 and 2016. On 2 December 2016, it was announced that the series would end after three seasons.

Ferguson signed in 2015 to play Prentiss Porter in The King of 7B, a comedy pilot for ABC.<ref name=7B>{{cite news |last=Lyons |first=Beverley |url=http://www.dailyrecord.co.uk/entertainment/celebrity/late-late-shows-craig-ferguson-5339755 |title=Late Late Show'''s Craig Ferguson begins work on new comedy pilot for US television |work=Daily Record |location=Glasgow, Scotland |date=15 March 2015 |access-date=15 March 2015}}</ref> The show was not picked up.

Join or Die with Craig Ferguson

On 18 February 2016, Ferguson began to host a historical talk show on History titled Join or Die with Craig Ferguson. The title is a reference to a Benjamin Franklin political cartoon published in the Pennsylvania Gazette on 9 May 1754, which Ferguson had tattooed on his forearm after becoming an American citizen. Ferguson and a three-guest panel of comedians and historians conduct a humorous discussion of a different topic on each episode, such as the most doomed presidential campaign, greatest Founding Father and greatest invention, with viewers invited to share their opinions via Twitter.

The Hustler

Since January 2021, Ferguson has hosted the American game show The Hustler, which airs on ABC. The show follows five contestants who collaborate to build up a cash prize by answering a series of trivia questions presented by Ferguson, while one of the contestants is secretly designated as the Hustler beforehand and given the answers to all the questions.

By the end of the game, two of the honest contestants have been eliminated; the other two must correctly choose the Hustler in order to stop the Hustler from winning the entire prize. The series premiered on January 4, 2021, before moving to its regular timeslot on January 7, 2021, airing on Thursdays at 10 p.m. In April 2022, it was reported that the series was cancelled, having aired 19 episodes across two seasons.

 Radio 
On 27 February 2017, Ferguson launched The Craig Ferguson Show, a two-hour talk radio show on the Comedy Greats channel and Faction Talk on SiriusXM Satellite Radio. His last new show aired 11 May 2018.

Literature
Ferguson's novel Between the Bridge and the River was published on 10 April 2006. He appeared at the Los Angeles Festival of Books, as well as other author literary events. "This book could scare them", he said. "The sex, the violence, the dream sequences and the iconoclasm. I think a lot of people are uncomfortable with that. I understand that. It was very uncomfortable to write some of it." The novel is dedicated to his elder son, Milo, and to his grandfather, Adam. He revealed in an interview that he is writing a sequel to the book, to be titled The Sphynx of the Mississippi. He also stated in a 2006 interview with David Letterman that he intends the book to be the first in a trilogy. As of February 2019, Ferguson has produced no further novels, although he has published non-fiction.

Ferguson signed a deal with HarperCollins to publish his memoirs. The book, entitled American on Purpose: The Improbable Adventures of an Unlikely Patriot, focuses on "how and why [he] became an American" and covers his years as a punk rocker, dancer, bouncer and construction worker as well as the rise of his career in Hollywood as an actor and comic. It went on sale 22 September 2009 in the United States. On 1 December 2010 the audiobook version was nominated for a Best Spoken Word Album Grammy.

In July 2009, Jackie Collins was a guest on The Late Late Show to promote her new book Married Lovers. Collins said a character in her book, Don Verona, was based on Ferguson because she was such a fan of him and his show.

Ferguson wrote a short story for In Sunlight or in Shadow (2017, Pegasus Crime), an anthology edited by Lawrence Block and featuring works inspired by the paintings of Edward Hopper (1882-1967). Block is a favorite writer of Ferguson's and appeared multiple times on The Late Late Show.

On 10 October 2018, Ferguson announced his third book via Twitter, Riding the Elephant: A Memoir of Altercations, Humiliations, Hallucinations, and Observations which released 7 May 2019.

Personal life
Ferguson is a fan of Scottish football team Partick Thistle F.C. as well as the television show Doctor Who. He holds an FAA private pilot certificate, issued in 2009. He has five tattoos which include the Join, or Die political cartoon on his right forearm; a Ferguson family crest with the Latin motto Dulcius ex asperis ("Sweeter out of [or from] difficulty") on his upper right arm in honour of his father; and a Celtic cross with the Ingram clan motto Magnanimus esto (Be great of mind) on his upper left arm in honour of his mother. He has often said that his Join, or Die tattoo is intended to signal his American patriotism. Ferguson returned to live in Scotland in 2019.Pathikrit Sanyal: Why did Craig Ferguson leave America? Talk show host was highly successful but returned to Scotland, here's why. MEAWW, 7 January 2021

Ferguson is a vegan (having stated in 2016 that he had been vegan for almost three years). He is a recovering alcoholic and has been sober since 1992.

As mentioned in episode 7 of his television show Join or Die, Ferguson also plays the harp (although not well and was kicked out of the band as a result).

Influences
Ferguson has stated that his comedy influences include Monty Python, Marx Brothers, The Three Stooges, Laurel and Hardy and David Letterman.

Family
Ferguson eulogised his father Robert on an episode of The Late Late Show in January 2006. Following the death of his mother Janet (3 August 1933 – 1 December 2008), he spoke of her on-air, ending the programme by playing her favourite song: "Rivers of Babylon" by Boney M.

Ferguson has two sisters (one older and one younger) and one older brother. His younger sister, Lynn Ferguson Tweddle, is also a comedian, presenter and actress, who voiced Mac in the 2000 stop-motion animation film Chicken Run. She was a writer on The Late Late Show until July 2011.

Ferguson was in a relationship with the actress Helen Atkinson-Wood for 5 years. He has married three times and divorced twice. His first marriage was to Anne Hogarth from 1983 to 1986, during which time they lived in New York. His second marriage was to Sascha Corwin (founder and proprietor of Los Angeles' SpySchool), with whom he has one child, born in 2001. He and Corwin shared custody of their child, and lived near each other in the Hollywood Hills. Ferguson married art dealer Megan Wallace-Cunningham in a private ceremony on her family's farm in Chester, Vermont in 2008. They have a son together, Liam, who was born in 2011.

American citizenship
During 2007, Ferguson, who at the time held only British citizenship, used The Late Late Show as a forum for seeking honorary citizenship from every state in the US. He received honorary citizenship from Alaska, Arkansas, Indiana, Montana, Nebraska, Nevada, New Jersey, North Dakota, Pennsylvania, South Carolina, South Dakota, Tennessee, Texas, Virginia, and Wyoming, and was "commissioned" as an admiral in the tongue-in-cheek Nebraska Navy. Governors Jon Corzine (New Jersey), John Hoeven (North Dakota), Mark Sanford (South Carolina), Mike Rounds (South Dakota), Rick Perry (Texas), Sarah Palin (Alaska) and Jim Gibbons (Nevada) sent letters to him that made him an honorary citizen of their respective states. He received similar honours from various towns and cities, including Ozark, Arkansas; Hazard, Kentucky; and Greensburg, Pennsylvania.

Ferguson became an American citizen on 1 February 2008 and broadcast the taking of his citizenship test as well as his swearing in on The Late Late Show.

Return to Scotland
Ferguson moved back to his native Scotland in 2019, and has been trying to sell his Los Angeles home.

Filmography

Film

Television

Web

Video games

Radio

Awards and nominations

Discography
 Live at the Tron (as Bing Hitler). Jammy Records. 1986. Catalogue number JRLP 861.
 Mental; Bing Hitler Is Dead? Polydor. 1988.
 A Big Stoatir. Polydor. 1990.
 I'm Here to Help. New Wave Dynamics. 2013.

References

Bibliography
 
 
Ferguson, Craig (2019). Riding the Elephant: A Memoir of Altercations, Humiliations, Hallucinations, and Observations.'' Penguin Group.

External links
 

1962 births
20th-century British comedians
20th-century British male actors
20th-century Scottish comedians
20th-century Scottish male actors
21st-century American comedians
21st-century American male actors
21st-century American novelists
21st-century Scottish comedians
21st-century Scottish male actors
21st-century Scottish novelists
American game show hosts
American male comedians
American male film actors
American male non-fiction writers
American male novelists
American male screenwriters
American male television actors
American male video game actors
American male voice actors
21st-century American memoirists
American stand-up comedians
American television talk show hosts
Audiobook narrators
Aviators from California
Burroughs Corporation people
Comedians from Glasgow
Daytime Emmy Award for Outstanding Game Show Host winners
Living people
Male actors from Glasgow
Male actors from Los Angeles
Male actors from New York City
Naturalized citizens of the United States
Novelists from New York (state)
Peabody Award winners
People from Cumbernauld
Scottish emigrants to the United States
Scottish expatriates in the United States
Scottish game show hosts
Scottish male film actors
Scottish male television actors
Scottish male video game actors
Scottish male voice actors
Scottish memoirists
Scottish stand-up comedians
Scottish television talk show hosts
Screenwriters from California
Screenwriters from New York (state)
The Late Late Show with Craig Ferguson
Writers from Glasgow
Writers from Los Angeles
Writers from New York City
People educated at Cumbernauld Academy
21st-century American male writers
United Service Organizations entertainers